Prank Patrol is a television show broadcast in multiple countries:

Prank Patrol (Australian TV series)
Prank Patrol (British TV series)
Prank Patrol (Canadian TV series)